Redon Dragoshi (born 18 March 2000) is an Albanian footballer who plays as a defender for FK Kukësi in the Kategoria Superiore.

Career

Kukësi
In August 2020, Dragoshi signed a two-year deal with Kukësi, making him at the time the youngest player in the squad's first team.

References

External links
Redon Dragoshi at SofaScore

2000 births
Living people
KF Erzeni players
Luftëtari Gjirokastër players
FK Kukësi players
Kategoria e Parë players
Kategoria Superiore players
Albanian footballers
Albania youth international footballers
Sportspeople from Tirana
Association football defenders